The 2018 Montreux Ladies Open was a professional tennis tournament played on outdoor clay courts. It was the second edition of the tournament and was part of the 2018 ITF Women's Circuit. It took place in Montreux, Switzerland, on 3–9 September 2018.

Singles main draw entrants

Seeds 

 1 Rankings as of 27 August 2018.

Other entrants 
The following players received a wildcard into the singles main draw:
  Timea Bacsinszky
  Leonie Küng
  Amra Sadiković
  Simona Waltert

The following players received entry from the qualifying draw:
  Cristiana Ferrando
  Andreea Mitu
  Tess Sugnaux
  Stephanie Wagner

Champions

Singles

 Iga Świątek def.  Kimberley Zimmermann, 6–2, 6–2

Doubles

 Andreea Mitu /  Elena-Gabriela Ruse def.  Laura Pigossi /  Maryna Zanevska, 4–6, 6–3, [10–4]

External links 
 2018 Montreux Ladies Open at ITFtennis.com
 Official website

2018 ITF Women's Circuit
2018 in Swiss women's sport
2018 in Swiss tennis
Montreux Ladies Open